Ouvéa Airport is an airport in Ouvéa, New Caledonia .

Airlines and destinations

References

Airports in New Caledonia